Melton Borough Council elections are held every four years. Melton Borough Council is the local authority for the non-metropolitan district of Melton in Leicestershire, England. Since the last boundary changes in 2003, 28 councillors have been elected from 16 wards.

Political control
The first election to the council was held in 1973, initially operating as a shadow authority before coming into its powers on 1 April 1974. Since 1973 political control of the council has been held by the following parties:

Leadership
The leaders of the council since 2010 have been:

Council elections
1973 Melton Borough Council election
1976 Melton Borough Council election
1979 Melton Borough Council election (New ward boundaries)
1983 Melton Borough Council election
1987 Melton Borough Council election (Borough boundary changes took place but the number of seats remained the same)
1991 Melton Borough Council election
1995 Melton Borough Council election
1999 Melton Borough Council election
2003 Melton Borough Council election (New ward boundaries)
2007 Melton Borough Council election
2011 Melton Borough Council election
2015 Melton Borough Council election
2019 Melton Borough Council election

Election results

By-election results

2003-2007

2007-2011

2011-2015

2015-2019

2019-2023

References

External links

 
Borough of Melton
Council elections in Leicestershire
District council elections in England